The Missouri Lottery is the state-run lottery in Missouri. It is a charter member of the Multi-State Lottery Association (MUSL). As of 2022, the lottery offers Powerball, Mega Millions, Cash4Life, Lotto, Show Me Cash, Pick 4, Pick 3, Cash Pop, Club Keno, scratchers, and pull-tabs. The minimum age to buy a ticket is 18.

The lottery was approved by voters in 1984 with 70% of the vote; the first sales beginning in 1986. Over $7 billion has been earned from the lottery for education.

History
The Lottery began selling tickets January 20, 1986. An executive director oversees the organization and reports to a five-member commission that is appointed by the governor.  May Scheve Reardon took over as Missouri Lottery executive director in December, 2009.

In the beginning, Lottery proceeds were directed to Missouri's General Revenue fund. In 1992, voters approved Amendment 11, which earmarked proceeds for public education. All monies since July 1993 have gone to education programs. Proceeds are appropriated by the Legislature.

The Lottery offers Scratchers tickets, plus the online games Missouri Lotto, Club Keno, Pick 3, Pick 4, Show Me Cash, and Powerball. Powerball's former rival, Mega Millions, came to Missouri on January 31, 2010. The $250,000 Scratcher card generated much publicity when unemployed couple Robert Russell and Tracie Rogers won the jackpot in July 2010.

The Lottery's mission: "The Missouri Lottery generates funds to provide educational opportunities for Missouri students, support Missouri businesses and entertain millions."

The minimum age to purchase a Missouri Lottery ticket is 18.

Lottery games

Current in-house games

Club Keno/Keno To Go
Club Keno has drawings every four minutes. Traditionally sold in age-controlled environments (often where alcoholic beverages are served), the game is now available at any Missouri Lottery retailer as Keno To Go. Options and prizes vary.

Scratchers
Scratch cards are the Lottery's most popular games, sold in a large variety of locations from gas stations to sports venues via vending machines. Card prices range from $1 to $50, with the more expensive games having better odds of winning as well as larger prizes. Themed scratchers are common (such as for holidays, promotional tie-ins with St. Louis and Kansas City sports teams, or licensed pop-culture properties) and players are occasionally encouraged to enter specific losing tickets into "second chance" drawings for additional prizes.

Pick 3
Pick 3 is drawn twice daily, seven days a week. Prices, options, and prizes vary.

Pick 4
Pick 4 is almost identical to Pick 3, except that a four-digit number is drawn.

Show Me Cash
Show Me Cash (previously called as Show Me 5) is played daily, drawing five numbers from 1 through 39. Games cost $1 each. Jackpots begin at $50,000, increasing by at least $5,000 until there is a game matching all five numbers.

Missouri Lotto
Missouri Lotto is drawn Wednesdays and Saturdays. Six numbers from 1 through 44 are chosen. Players get two games for each $1 wager (games must be played in multiples of two.) The progressive jackpot begins at $1,000,000 (annuitized with a cash option); players win cash by matching at least four of the six numbers in any game. A free $1 play is won by matching three numbers. The game's monetary prizes are paid on a pari-mutuel basis.

Beginning November 4, 2012, randomly selected Missouri Lotto tickets are printed with the word "Doubler". Any money prize (except a jackpot, or jackpot share) won on a Doubler ticket wins twice the normal amount; a three-number match wins a $2 free play (four games.)

Multi-jurisdictional games

Cash4Life

In 2014, New Jersey and New York launched Cash4Life. Initially drawn Mondays and Thursdays, Cash4Life has been drawn seven nights a week beginning July 1, 2019.

On April 11, 2021, Cash4Life become available in Missouri, becoming the game's 10th member. Three days earlier, Missouri ended sales of the rival game Lucky for Life which remains available in 24 states and the District of Columbia. Games are $2 each.

Mega Millions

On October 13, 2009, the Mega Millions consortium (then with 12 lotteries) and MUSL (with 33) reached an agreement to cross-sell Mega Millions and Powerball. Missouri joined Mega Millions on January 31, 2010, the cross-sell expansion date.

Mega Millions is drawn Tuesdays and Fridays. Players choose five white balls numbered 1 through 70, and a gold-colored "Mega Ball" numbered 1 through 25. Games are $1 each, or $2 if the Megaplier is chosen. Jackpots begin at $20 million, payable in 30 graduated yearly installments unless the cash option is chosen.

Powerball

Powerball began in 1992. Its jackpots begin at $20 million, with drawings on Monday, Wednesday, and Saturday nights.

Former games

Fun & Fortune
From 1996 to 2002, the Lottery aired a television game show called Fun & Fortune, hosted by Rick Tamblyn (nationally known Geoff Edwards hosted the pilot).

Lucky for Life
Lucky for Life began in Connecticut in 2009 as Lucky-4-Life. It grew by 2015 to include Missouri, and by 2018 it became available in 25 states and the District of Columbia. Missouri, on April 8, 2021, became the first Lucky for Life member to end sales, switching to Cash4Life three days later.

References

External links
Missouri Lottery website
Publications by or about the Missouri State Lottery Commission at Internet Archive.

State lotteries of the United States
Economy of Missouri
State agencies of Missouri